Shahrak-e Askan Ashayr (also Romanized as Shahrak-e Āsḵān ʿAshāyr) is a village in Sardarabad Rural District, in the Central District of Shushtar County, Khuzestan Province, Iran. At the 2006 census, its population was 1,881, in 324 families.

References 

Populated places in Shushtar County